Afrospilarctia flavidus is a moth of the family Erebidae. It was described by Max Bartel in 1903. It is found in Angola, Namibia, Nigeria and South Africa.

References

Spilosomina
Moths described in 1903
Moths of Africa